These are the representatives elected in the 2010 Philippine House of Representatives elections.

District representatives
Seats highlighted in gray are districts in which boundaries were altered.

Sectoral representatives

Elected via closed lists, each party can return up to three representatives. If the person quits the party, the representative also loses one's seat. In any vacancy, the person next in line assumes the party's seat. For changes after the first seat was awarded for a party, see Change of seats in the 15th Congress.

1-CARE
Salvadore Cabaluna III
Michael Angelo Rivera
1-UTAK
Homero Mercado
A TEACHER
Julieta Cortuna
Mariano Piamonte, Jr.
AAMBIS-Owa
Sharon Garin
Aangat Tayo
Daryl Grace Abayon
Abante Mindanao
Maximo Rodriguez, Jr.
Abono
Robert Raymond Estrella
ABS
Catalina Leonen-Pizarro
Alliance of Concerned Teachers
Antonio Tinio
AGAP
Nicanor Briones
Agbiag
Patricio Antonio
AGHAM
Angelo Palmones
AGP
Mikey Arroyo
Akbayan
Kaka Bag-ao
Walden Bello

AKB
Rodel Batocabe
Christopher Co
Alfredo Garbin, Jr.
Alagad
Rodel Batocabe
ALE
Catalina Bagasina
ALIF
Acmad Tomawis
An Waray
Neil Benedict Montejo
Florencio Noel
ANAD
Pastor Alcover, Jr.
Anakpawis
Rafael Mariano 
Ang Kasangga
Teodorico Haresco
APEC
Ponciano Payuyo
ATING Koop
Isidro Lico
AVE
Eulogio Magsaysay
Bagong Henerasyon
Bernadette Herrera-Dy
Bayan Muna
Teddy Casiño
Neri Colmenares
Buhay
Erwin Tieng
Michael Velarde, Jr.

Butil
Agapito Guanlao
CIBAC
Cinchoma Cruz-Gonzales
Sherwin Tugna
Coop-NATCCO
Jose R. Ping-ay
Cresente Paez
DIWA
Emmeline Aglipay
GABRIELA
Emeranciana de Jesus
Luzminda Ilagan
Kabataan
Raymond Palatino
KAKUSA
Ranulfo Canonigo
Kalinga
Abigail Faye Ferriol
Kasosyo
Solaiman Pangandaman
LPG Markerters Association
Arnel Ty
PBA
Mark Aeron Sambar
Senior Citizens
Godofredo Arquiza
David Kho
TUCP
Raymond Democrito Mendoza
Una ang Pamilya
Reena Concepcion Obillo
YACAP
Carol Jayne Lopez

See also
List of senators elected in the Philippine Senate election, 2010

2010 Philippine general election